The 2013 Asian Canoe Sprint Championships were the 15th Asian Canoe Sprint Championships and took place from September 26–29, 2013 in Samarkand, Uzbekistan.

Medal summary

Men

Women

Medal table

References

External links
Asian Canoe Confedeation

Canoe Sprint Championships
Asian Canoe Sprint Championships
Asian Canoeing Championships
International sports competitions hosted by Uzbekistan